Petar Stoychev (born 15 February 1946) is a Bulgarian boxer. He competed in the men's light welterweight event at the 1968 Summer Olympics.

References

1946 births
Living people
Bulgarian male boxers
Olympic boxers of Bulgaria
Boxers at the 1968 Summer Olympics
Sportspeople from Plovdiv
Light-welterweight boxers